Welcome to My World is the second album by Swedish singer Jonathan Fagerlund following his debut album Flying. It includes the single "Welcome to My Life" that he performed in 2009 during Melodifestivalen 2009 in a bid to represent Sweden in Eurovision Song Contest 2009 to be held in Moscow, Russia.

Track list
"Ready 4 It"
"Definite Maybe"
"Welcome to My Life"
"Tunnel Vision"
"Save Our Yesterdays"
"Think I'm Gonna Like It Here"
"Don't Worry"
"Magnifying Glass"
"Somebody Better"
"U Do"
"She Came Back For Me"
"Stay"
"Welcome to My Life (Mac D Remix)"

Charts

References

2009 albums
Jonathan Fagerlund albums